Skellington may refer to:

 Skellington Productions, a film production company
 Jack Skellington, a character from the 1993 film The Nightmare Before Christmas
 Skellington (band)
 Skellington (album), a 1989 album by Julian Cope
 Skellington 3, a 2018 album by Julian Cope
 Pirate Skellington, "A Skellington?" - Mr Centepide. A skeleton similar to Jack appears in the movie James and the Giant Peach.

See also
 "Skelington", a song by British Jazz Rock band Colosseum, originally from their 1971 album Colosseum Live
 Skillington, a village and civil parish in Lincolnshire, England